Ryan McMahon may refer to:
 Ryan McMahon (baseball), American baseball infielder
 Ryan McMahon (comedian), Anishinaabe comedian, podcaster and writer
 Ryan McMahon (singer-songwriter), Canadian singer-songwriter
 Ryan McMahon (musician), member of the Irish band Inhaler
 Ryan McMahon, member of songwriting and record production team Captain Cuts

See also
 Ryan McMahen, American soccer player